The Chapel of St. Therese is a former Roman Catholic parish church under the authority of the Roman Catholic Archdiocese of New York, located in Valley Cottage, Rockland County, New York. The parish was established as a mission in 1927 of St. Paul in Congers. It was closed in 1963.

References 

Christian organizations established in 1927
Closed churches in the Roman Catholic Archdiocese of New York
Closed churches in New York (state)
Roman Catholic churches in New York (state)
Churches in Rockland County, New York